Mariusz Fyrstenberg and Marcin Matkowski were the defending champions, but lost in the first round to Feliciano López and Fernando Verdasco.

Max Mirnyi and Andy Ram won in the final 6–1, 7–5, against Philipp Petzschner and Alexander Peya.

Seeds

Draw

Draw

External links
Draw

Doubles